Three Veils is a 2011 film written and directed by Rolla Selbak and starring Sheetal Sheth, Angela Zahra and Mercedes Masöhn. The film is notable for featuring a lesbian character. Selbak herself is a lesbian. It has won several awards.

Plot summary
Three Veils is about three young Middle-Eastern women living in the U.S, each with their own personal story. Leila (Mercedes Masöhn) is engaged to be married, however as the wedding night approaches, she becomes less and less sure. Amira (Angela Zahra) is a devout Muslim, but is dealing with her deep repressed lesbian feelings. Nikki (Sheetal Sheth) is acting out her promiscuity as she battles her own demons after a tragic death in the family. As the film progresses, all three stories unfold and blend into each other as connections are revealed between the three women.

Cast
Sheetal Sheth as Nikki
Angela Zahra as Amira
Mercedes Masöhn as Leila
Madeleine Tabar as Samira
Erick Avari as Mr. Qasim
Garen Boyajian as Jamal
Christopher Maleki as Mehdi
Sammy Sheik as Ali
Andrew J. Ferranti as Hafiz
Silvi Sebastian as Aunt Fatima
Desmond Faison	as Wes
Andria Carpenter as Little Nikki
Lexi Greene as Little Amira
Chelsea Gray as Shoshana
Anne Bedian as Farridah

References

External links

American LGBT-related films
2011 films
2011 LGBT-related films
LGBT-related drama films
2011 drama films
2010s English-language films
2010s American films